AD 8 was a leap year starting on Sunday (link will display the full calendar) of the Julian calendar. In the Roman Empire, it was known as the Year of the Consulship of Camillus and Quinctilianus (or, less frequently, 761 Ab urbe condita). The denomination "AD 8" for this year has been used since the early medieval period, when the Anno Domini calendar era became the prevalent method in Europe for naming years.

Events

By place

Roman Empire 
 August 3 – Roman general Tiberius defeats the Illyrians in Dalmatia on the River Bathinus, but the Great Illyrian Revolt continues.
 Vipsania Julia is exiled. Lucius Aemilius Paullus and his family are disgraced. Augustus breaks off the engagement of Claudius to Paullus' daughter Aemilia Lepida. An effort is made to betroth Claudius to Livia Medullina Camilla.
 Roman poet Ovid is banished from Rome and exiled to the Black Sea near Tomis (modern-day Constanța).

Europe 
 Tincomarus, deposed king of the Atrebates, flees Britain for Rome; Eppillus becomes king.

Persia 
 Vonones I becomes king (shah) of the Parthian Empire.

Judea 
 Finding in the Temple: Jesus is found in the Temple of Jerusalem reasoning with the learned men of Judea.

China 
 Start of Chushi era of the Chinese Han Dynasty.
 Wang Mang crushes a rebellion by Chai I, and on the winter solstice (which has been dated January 10 of the following year) officially assumes the title emperor, establishing the short-lived Xin Dynasty.

By topic

Arts 
 After completing Metamorphoses, Ovid begins the Fasti (Festivals), 6 books that detail the first 6 months of the year and provide valuable insights into the Roman calendar.

Births 
 Drusus Caesar, member of the Julio-Claudian Dynasty (d. AD 33)
 Titus Flavius Sabinus, Roman consul and brother of Vespasian (d. AD 69)

Deaths 
 Marcus Valerius Messalla Corvinus, Roman general (b. 64 BC)

References

Sources

 

 

als:0er#Johr 8